Events from the year 1978 in Canada.

Incumbents

Crown 
 Monarch – Elizabeth II

Federal government 
 Governor General – Jules Léger
 Prime Minister – Pierre Trudeau
 Chief Justice – Bora Laskin (Ontario)
 Parliament – 30th

Provincial governments

Lieutenant governors 
Lieutenant Governor of Alberta – Ralph Steinhauer  
Lieutenant Governor of British Columbia – Walter Stewart Owen (until May 18) then Henry Pybus Bell-Irving 
Lieutenant Governor of Manitoba – Francis Lawrence Jobin 
Lieutenant Governor of New Brunswick – Hédard Robichaud
Lieutenant Governor of Newfoundland – Gordon Arnaud Winter 
Lieutenant Governor of Nova Scotia – Clarence Gosse (until December 23) then John Elvin Shaffner 
Lieutenant Governor of Ontario – Pauline Mills McGibbon
Lieutenant Governor of Prince Edward Island – Gordon Lockhart Bennett 
Lieutenant Governor of Quebec – Hugues Lapointe (until April 27) then Jean-Pierre Côté
Lieutenant Governor of Saskatchewan – George Porteous (until February 6) then Irwin McIntosh (from February 22)

Premiers 
Premier of Alberta – Peter Lougheed  
Premier of British Columbia – Bill Bennett 
Premier of Manitoba – Sterling Lyon 
Premier of New Brunswick – Richard Hatfield
Premier of Newfoundland – Frank Moores
Premier of Nova Scotia – Gerald Regan (until October 5) then John Buchanan 
Premier of Ontario – Bill Davis 
Premier of Prince Edward Island – Alexander B. Campbell (until September 18) then Bennett Campbell 
Premier of Quebec – René Lévesque
Premier of Saskatchewan – Allan Blakeney

Territorial governments

Commissioners 
 Commissioner of Yukon – Arthur MacDonald Pearson (until November 1) then Frank Fingland (interim) 
 Commissioner of Northwest Territories – Stuart Milton Hodgson

Premiers 
Premier of Yukon – Chris Pearson (from November 20)

Events
January 12 – Via Rail Canada is established as a Crown corporation
January 24 – Cosmos 954, a Soviet satellite, breaks up over northern Canada.
June 26 – An Air Canada DC-9 overruns a runway in Toronto. Two people die.
August 4 – 41 are killed when a bus plunges into a lake near Eastman, Quebec.
September 15 – The Sudbury Strike of 1978 begins.
September 18 – Bennett Campbell becomes premier of Prince Edward Island, replacing Alexander B. Campbell
October 5 – John MacLennan Buchanan becomes premier of Nova Scotia, replacing Gerald Regan
October 16 – At midnight after a year and a half of conciliation the Canadian Union of Postal Workers goes on strike. 
October 16 – Fifteen federal by-elections are held across the country.  The governing Liberals lose five seats, which leads to a general election the following May.
October 17 – Parliament votes to force the postal workers back to work. 
October 18 – Saskatchewan election: Allan Blakeney's NDP win a third consecutive majority. Despite accusations of marital infidelity, Colin Thatcher, who would later be involved in the murder of his ex-wife, is re-elected to the Saskatchewan Legislative Assembly.
December 14 – Chris Pearson becomes government leader of Yukon as responsible government is instituted

Full date unknown
Rexdale Women's Centre is founded in Toronto.
Supreme Court of Canada declares unilingual legislatures and courts unconstitutional
Under the new immigration act homosexuals are no longer an inadmissible class

Arts and literature

New works
Margaret Atwood: Up in the Tree
Mordecai Richler: The Great Comic Book Heroes and Other Essays
John Newlove: The Fat Man: Selected Poems (1962–1972)
John Gray and Eric Peterson: Billy Bishop Goes to War
Henry Beissel: Goya

Awards
Alice Munro's Who Do You Think You Are? is nominated for the Booker Prize
See 1979 Governor General's Awards for a complete list of winners and finalists for those awards.
Stephen Leacock Award: Ernest Buckler, Whirligig
Vicky Metcalf Award: Lyn Cook

Sport
March 19 – Alberta Golden Bears win their fourth University Cup by defeating the Toronto Varsity Blues 6–5. The final game was played at Moncton Coliseum
May 13 – New Westminster Bruins win the second (consecutive) Memorial Cup by defeating the Peterborough Petes 7–4. The final game was played at Sudbury Community Arena
May 22 – Winnipeg Jets win their second Avco Cup by defeating the New England Whalers 4 games to 0.
May 25 – Montreal Canadiens win their 21st (third consecutive) Stanley Cup by defeating the Boston Bruins 4 games to 2. Winchester, Ontario's Larry Robinson was awarded the Conn Smythe Trophy
July 15 – Commonwealth Stadium opens in Edmonton
August 3 to 12 – The Commonwealth Games are held in Edmonton
October 10 – Wayne Gretzky plays his first professional game for the Indianapolis Racers and would be traded to the Edmonton Oilers after 25 games
November 18 – Queen's Golden Gaels win their second Vanier Cup by defeating the UBC Thunderbirds 16–3 in the 14th Vanier Cup played at Varsity Stadium in Toronto
November 26 – Edmonton Eskimos win their fifth Grey Cup by defeating the Montreal Alouettes 20–13 in the 66th Grey Cup played at Exhibition Stadium in Toronto. Hamilton, Ontario's Angelo Santucci was named the game's Most Valuable Canadian

Births

January to March
January 1 - Jean-Pierre Dumont, ice hockey player
January 3 - Daryn Jones, comedian and television and radio personality
January 6 - Nikki Einfeld, operatic soprano and actress
January 24 – Mark Hildreth, actor
January 25 – Gordie Dwyer, ice hockey player and coach
January 27 - Pete Laforest, Canadian-American baseball player and manager
February 20 - Andrea Moody, swimmer
February 26 - Kyle Hamilton, rower, Olympic gold medallist and World Champion
March 9 - Chris Phillips, ice hockey player

April to June
April 6 - Thomas Herschmiller, rower, Olympic silver medallist and World Champion
April 18 - Alexis Mazurin, comedian and radio personality (d.2005)
April 26 - Tyler Labine, actor
May 3 - Autumn Kelly the wife of Peter Phillips
May 12 
 Aaron Abrams, actor
 Amy Sloan, actress
May 15 - Dwayne De Rosario, soccer player
May 15 - Caroline Dhavernas, actress
June 2 - Shane Niemi, sprint athlete
June 13 - Matt Bradley, ice hockey player
June 14 - Steve Bégin, ice hockey player
June 28 - Simon Larose, tennis player

July to December
July 4 - Marie Luc Arpin, water polo player
July 11 - Kathleen Edwards, singer-songwriter
July 22 - A. J. Cook, actress
August 4 - Karine Legault, swimmer
August 24 – Derek Morris, ice hockey player
August 28 – Karine Turcotte, weightlifter
September 1 - Joe Stankevicius, rower and World Champion
September 5 - Laura Bertram, actress
September 6 - Amy Agulay, field hockey player
September 7 - Matt Cooke, ice hockey player
September 7 - Devon Sawa, actor
September 17 -
Shawn Horcoff, ice hockey player
Nick Cordero, actor and singer
September 20 - Jason Bay, baseball player
September 21 - Paulo Costanzo, actor
September 22 - Steve Moore, ice hockey player
October 17 - Erin Karpluk, actress
November 2 - Nelly Furtado, singer-songwriter, record producer and actress
November 16 - Steve Omischl, freestyle skier
November 17 - Rachel McAdams, actress
December 23 - Esthero, singer-songwriter

Deaths
March 25 - Charles Alexander Best, politician (b.1931)
March 31 - Charles Best, medical scientist, co-discoverer of insulin (b.1899)
April 13 - Jack Chambers, artist and filmmaker (b.1931)
July 18 - Claude P. Dettloff, photographer (b. 1899)
September 9 - Jack L. Warner, studio mogul (b.1892)
September 28 - Thane Campbell, jurist, politician and Premier of Prince Edward Island (b.1895)
October 23 - Joe Greene, politician (b.1920)

Full date unknown
Carl Ray, artist (b.1943)

See also
 1978 in Canadian television
 List of Canadian films of 1978

References

 
Years of the 20th century in Canada
Canada
1978 in North America